Orlando de la Torre Castro (21 November 1943 – 24 August 2022) was a Peruvian footballer who played as a defender.

Club career
de la Torre began his club career by playing for Sporting Cristal at the age of 17 as a central defender, going on to win the Peruvian Primera División in 1968, 1970 and 1972.

International career
De la Torre played for the Peru national team between 1967 and 1973, gaining 39 caps. He was part of the Peru squad for the 1970 World Cup.

References

External links 
 
 

1943 births
2022 deaths
1970 FIFA World Cup players
People from Trujillo, Peru
Peruvian footballers
Association football defenders
Peru international footballers
Sporting Cristal footballers
Atlético Chalaco footballers
Juan Aurich footballers
Juan Aurich managers
Sport Boys footballers
Sport Boys managers
Deportivo Municipal managers